Richard Oehler (27 February 1878, Heckholzhausen, Hesse-Nassau – 13 November 1948, Wiesbaden) was a German Nietzsche scholar – an early editor of the philosopher's works, and author of Friedrich Nietzsche und die deutsche Zukunft (Leipzig: Armanen-Verlag, 1935), which has been characterized by  Walter Kaufmann as "one of the first Nazi books on Nietzsche" (Basic Writings of Nietzsche, New York: The Modern Library, 2000, p. 387, n. 27). His brother was Max Oehler, who directed the Nietzsche Archive in Weimar, Germany. The Oehlers were family relations of the Nietzsches.

References

 Ernst Klee, Das Kulturlexikon zum Dritten Reich. Wer war was vor und nach 1945. S. Fischer, Frankfurt am Main 2007, p. 440.

1878 births
1948 deaths
People from Limburg-Weilburg
People from Hesse-Nassau
German scholars
Nazi Party politicians
Militant League for German Culture members
Förderndes Mitglied der SS
SS personnel
Nietzsche scholars